Lassallism is the strategy of the pursuit of socialism through the use of the state.  This school of thought developed from German jurist and socialist activist Ferdinand Lassalle.

This school of thought diverged from the route to socialism propounded by Karl Marx.  Marx advocated a revolutionary strategy and focused on organizing through workers' organizations.  Lassalle, on the other hand, emphasized pursuing socialism through electoral institutions, particularly through universal suffrage.  Lassalle focused on organizing through engagement with the state via political parties.  Opponents of Lassalle critiqued his socialism as state socialism.   

The practice of Lassallism carried forward in the General German Workers' Association (ADAV), formed in 1863, and after the 1864 death of Lassalle.  The General German Workers' Association would be a precursor to the Social Democratic Party of Germany (SPD).  The SPD aimed for revolution and threatened the German political status quo, which induced Otto von Bismarck to introduce the first social reforms (State Socialism) for workers in Imperial Germany while suppressing the SPD with laws. The SPD exercised a fundamental opposition to the government until the 1890s when they supported the social reforms in the domestic policies by Arthur von Posadowsky-Wehner.

The tension between Lassallism and Marxism in the United States would receive later attention in Philip S. Foner's History of the Labor Movement in the United States, Volume II and in David Caute's The Left in Europe.  Caute contended that the Marxists in Europe gained advantage relative to Lassallism with Lassalle's passing in 1864.

See also
State socialism
Statism
Reformism
Eduard Bernstein

Notes

Eponymous political ideologies
Political ideologies
Types of socialism
Ferdinand Lassalle